is a former Japanese football player.

Playing career
Yonezawa was born in Osaka Prefecture on February 6, 1969. After graduating from Osaka University of Health and Sport Sciences, he joined Japan Football League (JFL) club Yamaha Motors (later Júbilo Iwata) in 1991. He played as center back for the club until 1995. In 1996, he moved to his local club Gamba Osaka. However he could not play at all in the match. In 1997, he moved to JFL club Oita Trinity. He retired end of 1997 season.

Club statistics

References

External links

1969 births
Living people
Osaka University of Health and Sport Sciences alumni
Association football people from Osaka Prefecture
Japanese footballers
J1 League players
Japan Football League (1992–1998) players
Júbilo Iwata players
Gamba Osaka players
Oita Trinita players
Association football defenders